Lebanese Druze are Lebanese people who are Druze. The Druze faith is a monotheistic and Abrahamic religion, and an ethnoreligious esoteric group originating from the Near East who self identify as unitarians.

The Lebanese Druze people are believed to constitute about 5.2 percent of the total population of Lebanon and have around 1.5 million members worldwide. The Druze, who refer to themselves as al-Muwahhideen, or "believers in one God," are concentrated in the rural, mountainous areas east and south of Beirut. Lebanon has the world's second largest Druze population, after Syria.

Under the Lebanese political division (Parliament of Lebanon Seat Allocation) the Druze community is designated as one of the five Lebanese Muslim communities in Lebanon (Sunni, Shia, Druze, Alawi, and Ismaili), even though the Druze are no longer considered Muslim. Lebanon's constitution was intended to guarantee political representation for each of the nation's ethno-religious groups.

Wadi al-Taym is generally considered the "birthplace of the Druze faith". The Maronite Catholic and the Druze founded modern Lebanon in the early eighteenth century, through the ruling and social system known as the "Maronite-Druze dualism" in Mount Lebanon Mutasarrifate. Under the terms of an unwritten agreement known as the National Pact between the various political and religious leaders of Lebanon, the Chief of the General Staff must be a Druze.

History

The Druze faith does not follow the Five Pillars of Islam, such as fasting during the month of Ramadan, and making a pilgrimage to Mecca. The Druze beliefs incorporate elements of Ismailism, Gnosticism, Neoplatonism and other philosophies. The Druze call themselves Ahl al-Tawhid "People of Unitarianism or Monotheism" or "al-Muwaḥḥidūn.""The Druze follow a lifestyle of isolation where no conversion is allowed, neither out of, or into, the religion. When Druze live among people of other religions, they try to blend in, in order to protect their religion and their own safety. They can pray as Muslims, or as Christians, depending on where they are. This system is apparently changing in modern times, where more security has allowed Druze to be more open about their religious belonging."The Tanukhids inaugurated the Druze community in Lebanon when most of them accepted and adopted the new message that was being preached in the 11th century, due to their leaderships close ties with then Fatimid ruler Al-Hakim bi-Amr Allah.
The relationship between the Druze and Christians in Lebanon has been characterized by harmony and coexistence, with amicable relations between the two groups prevailing throughout history, with the exception of some periods, including 1860 Mount Lebanon civil war.

Historically the relationship between the Druze and Muslims has been characterized by intense persecution. The Druze faith is often classified as a branch of Isma'ili. Even though the faith originally developed out of Ismaili Islam, most Druze do not identify as Muslims, and they do not accept the five pillars of Islam. The Druze have frequently experienced persecution by different Muslim regimes such as the Shia Fatimid Caliphate, Sunni Ottoman Empire, and Egypt Eyalet. The persecution of the Druze included massacres, demolishing Druze prayer houses and holy places and forced conversion to Islam. Those were no ordinary killings in the Druze's narrative, they were meant to eradicate the whole community according to the Druze narrative.

The Druze community in Lebanon played an important role in the formation of the modern state of Lebanon, and even though they are a minority they play an important role in the Lebanese political scene. Before and during the Lebanese Civil War (1975–90), the Druze were in favor of Pan-Arabism and Palestinian resistance represented by the PLO. Most of the community supported the Progressive Socialist Party formed by their leader Kamal Jumblatt and they fought alongside other leftist and Palestinian parties against the Lebanese Front that was mainly constituted of Christians. After the assassination of Kamal Jumblatt on 16 March 1977, his son Walid Jumblatt took the leadership of the party and played an important role in preserving his father's legacy after winning the Mountain War and sustained the existence of the Druze community during the sectarian bloodshed that lasted until 1990.

In August 2001, Maronite Catholic Patriarch Nasrallah Boutros Sfeir toured the predominantly Druze Chouf region of Mount Lebanon and visited Mukhtara, the ancestral stronghold of Druze leader Walid Jumblatt. The tumultuous reception that Sfeir received not only signified a historic reconciliation between Maronites and Druze, who fought a bloody war in 1983–84, but underscored the fact that the banner of Lebanese sovereignty had broad multi-confessional appeal and was a cornerstone for the Cedar Revolution in 2005. Jumblatt's post-2005 position diverged sharply from the tradition of his family. He also accused Damascus of being behind the 1977 assassination of his father, Kamal Jumblatt, expressing for the first time what many knew he privately suspected. The BBC describes Jumblatt as "the smartest leader of Lebanon's most powerful Druze clan and heir to a leftist political dynasty".

On May 10, 2008 as part of the 2008 Conflict, clashes occurred between Hezbollah forces and Druze militias in their mountain resulting is casualties on both sides. The clashes started in Aytat, near Kayfoun and soon expanded to cover many spots in Mount Lebanon including Baysur, Shuweifat and Aley. Most of the fighting was concentrated on Hill 888. After negotiations a ceasefire was called in from outside the country before Hezbollah could call in artillery support. Releases from Hezbollah leaders in 2016 stated that bombing the mountain with close-range artillery from the South and longer-ranged artillery from Syria were both an option and greatly considered.

Lebanese Christians and Druze became a genetic isolate in the predominantly Islamic world.

A number of the Druze embraced Christianity, such as some of Shihab dynasty members, as well as the Abi-Lamma clan, and Khazen family. During the nineteenth and twentieth centuries, Protestant missionaries established schools and churches in Druze strongholds, with some Druze converting to Protestant Christianity; yet they did not succeed to convert Druze to Christianity en masse. On the other hand, many Druze immigrants to the United States converted to Protestantism, becoming communicants of the Presbyterian or Methodist Churches.

Demographics

According to scholar Colbert C. Held of University of Nebraska, Lincoln the number of Druze people worldwide is around one million, with about 45% to 50% live in Syria, 35% to 40% live in Lebanon, and less than 10% live in Israel, with recently there has been a growing Druze diaspora.

The Druze are concentrated in the rural, mountainous areas east and south of Beirut. The Lebanese Druze are estimated to constitute 5.2 percent of Lebanon's population. They live in 136 villages in Hasbaya, Rashaya, Chouf, Aley, Marjeyoun and Beirut, and they constitute the majority of the population in the city of Aley, Baakleen, Hasbaya and Rashaya. The Druze make up more than half of the population of the Aley District, and they constitute about a third of the residents of the Rachaya District, and they constitute about the quarter of residents of the Chouf District and the Matn District.

Notable people

Fakhr-al-Din II (1572–1635), a Druze prince and an early leader of the Emirate of Chouf.
Emir Shakib Arslan (1869–1946), a Druze prince and notable Islamic scholar. 
Emir Majid Arslan (1908–1983), head of the Arslan feudal Druze ruling family and leader of the final independence movement for Lebanon.
Kamal Jumblatt (1917–1977), a prominent Lebanese progressive socialist politician.
Casey Kasem (1932–2014), a Lebanese-American radio personality/DJ born in Detroit.
Ahmad Abou Zaki (1941-2014), a general in the Lebanese Internal Security Forces.
Nabil Kanso (born 1946), a Lebanese-American painter.
Akram Chehayeb (born 1947), a Lebanese politician, member of parliament, and Minister of Agriculture.
Walid Jumblatt (born 1949), a Lebanese politician and the current leader of the Progressive Socialist Party (PSP). 
Raghida Dergham (born 1953), a Lebanese-American journalist based in New York. 
Ghazi Aridi (born 1954), a Lebanese politician, and member of parliament.
Samir Kuntar (1962–2015), a member of the Palestine Liberation Front representing Hezbollah.
Emir Talal Arslan (born 1965), Lebanese politician and the head of the mostly Druze Lebanese Democratic Party.
Mona Abou Hamze (born 1972), a TV presenter.
Amal Clooney (born 1978), a London-based British-Lebanese lawyer, activist, and author (Druze father and Sunni mother).

See also

 Chouf District
 Druze
 Shia Islam in Lebanon
 Sunni Islam in Lebanon
 Maronite Christianity in Lebanon
 Christianity in Lebanon
 Roman Catholicism in Lebanon
 Melkite Christianity in Lebanon
 Eastern Orthodox Christianity in Lebanon
 Protestantism in Lebanon
 Religion in Lebanon
 Lebanese Democratic Party
 Progressive Socialist Party

References